Hewitsonia is a genus of butterflies in the family Lycaenidae. The species of this genus are endemic to the Afrotropical realm.

Species
Hewitsonia amieti Bouyer, 1997
Hewitsonia beryllina Schultze, 1916
Hewitsonia bitjeana Bethune-Baker, 1915
Hewitsonia boisduvalii (Hewitson, 1869)
Hewitsonia congoensis Joicey & Talbot, 1921
Hewitsonia danane Stempffer, 1969
Hewitsonia inexpectata Bouyer, 1997
Hewitsonia intermedia Jackson, 1962
Hewitsonia kirbyi Dewitz, 1879
Hewitsonia kuehnei Collins & Larsen, 2008
Hewitsonia magdalenae Stempffer, 1951
Hewitsonia occidentalis Bouyer, 1997
Hewitsonia prouvosti Bouyer, 1997
Hewitsonia similis (Aurivillius, 1891)
Hewitsonia ugandae Jackson, 1962

External links
"Hewitsonia Kirby, 1871" at Markku Savela's Lepidoptera and Some Other Life Forms
Seitz, A. Die Gross-Schmetterlinge der Erde 13: Die Afrikanischen Tagfalter. Plate XIII 64 f

Poritiinae
Lycaenidae genera